Somorjit Salam (born 27 January 1994) is an Indian cricketer. He made his List A debut for Manipur in the 2018–19 Vijay Hazare Trophy on 6 October 2018. He made his Twenty20 debut on 12 November 2019, for Manipur in the 2019–20 Syed Mushtaq Ali Trophy. He made his first-class debut on 4 February 2020, for Manipur in the 2019–20 Ranji Trophy.

References

External links
 

1994 births
Living people
Indian cricketers
Manipur cricketers
Place of birth missing (living people)